The Workers' Stadium, often abbreviated as Gongti or Gong Ti, is a football stadium in the Chaoyang District, Beijing, China. The stadium was built in 1959, and was renovated in 2004 (the concrete structure strengthened, a new rotating display screen and energy-saving devices installed). The stadium was closed for rebuild in 2020. It is scheduled to reopen in March 2023. It was one of the Ten Great Buildings constructed in 1959 for the tenth anniversary of the People's Republic of China.

History

The stadium was the main venue for the 1990 Asian Games, where the opening and closing ceremonies were held. Some high attendance matches of the Beijing Guo'an football club are held at the stadium. In 1993, the stadium was host to a slew of world records set by the world-leading group of Chinese distance runners at the seventh edition of the Chinese National Games, the most famous being international stars and world champions Wang Junxia and Qu Yunxia, who had dominated the 1993 World Championships a month before.

The stadium holds claim to the fastest women's 1500 m time ever recorded of 3:50.46, the fastest women's 3000 m of 8:06.11 and the fastest women's 10,000 m of 29:31.78. These world records still stand today and are arguably the stadium's biggest claim to fame. The next year, the stadium was partially demolished and renovated as part of China's bid for the 2000 Olympic Games, which ultimately failed. The stadium continued to be a mainstay of Beijing sports into the 21st century, being the 2001 Summer Universiade and the Grand Final venue of 2004 AFC Asian Cup.

After Beijing became the host of the 2008 Summer Olympics in July 2001 which the stadium was originally intended as the main venue, it hosted the football quarter-finals and semi-finals, and the women's gold medal final. The stadium was scheduled to host the first ever NFL game played in China, a preseason game between the Seattle Seahawks and the New England Patriots on August 8, 2007. However, the China Bowl was canceled in April 2007. The reasons given were that the NFL wanted to devote all its resources to the scheduled regular season game between the Miami Dolphins and the New York Giants, to be played in London on October 28, 2007.

The stadium was the host for the 2009 Barclays Asia Trophy between 29 July and 31 July 2009, featuring Beijing Guoan, and Premier League clubs Tottenham Hotspur, West Ham United and Hull City. It also hosted FC Bayern Munich's pre-season China Tour of 2012, during which the Bundesliga club had a friendly match with Beijing Guoan. The areas north (Sanlitun), east, and west of the stadium are popular nightlife destinations. The xi men (West Gate) offers a strip of nightclubs. The Workers Indoor Arena is located to the west of the stadium. The stadium has been used for concerts as well. Global superstar Mariah Carey began her sold-out five-show tour at the Workers Stadium, and Linkin Park played The Hunting Party Tour at July 26, 2015 in front of an audience of 60,000.

New stadium
On 4 January 2020, Workers' Stadium was announced as a host venue for the 2023 AFC Asian Cup. However, on 14 May 2022, AFC announced that China would not be able to host the tournament due to the exceptional circumstances caused by the COVID-19 pandemic.

After finishing the 2019 season, Beijing Guoan moved its home stadium the Beijing Fengtai Stadium for three years while renovations ahead of the tournament took place. The engineering firm of the rebuild project is Beijing Construction Engineering Group. The renovated Workers’ Stadium will open in March 2023.

On December 31, 2022, the new Workers' Stadium hosted its first event. The New Year's Eve party called "Embrace a New Journey-2023BRTV New Year's Eve" took place in the stadium and was broadcast on Beijing Satellite TV.

Notable concerts
 August 6, 1999: A-mei - Mei Li 99
 October 13, 2002: Glay - Glay One Love In Beijing, audience: 35,000
 August 28, 2004: Faye Wong - No Faye! No Live! Tour
 September 23, 2005: S.H.E - Fantasy Land world tour
 October 22, 2005: Rain - Rainy Day 2005 Tour
 May 1, 2008: Jay Chou - Jay Chou 2007 World Tour
 September 16, 2011: SMAP - We are SMAP! 2011 live in Beijing
 May 17, 2014:Dave Wang Dave Wang comeback World Tour
 October 10, 2014: Mariah Carey - The Elusive Chanteuse Show, audience: 60,000
 October 19, 2014: YG Entertainment - Power World Tour
 July 26, 2015: Linkin Park - The Hunting Party Tour
 July 14, 2018: Joker Xue - Skyscraper World Tour

References

External links

Stadium pictures
Football stadia in China 
Sports Illustrated Article, retrieved April 03, 2007 
The Chronicle of Gongti Ximen, article about nightlife area

Sports venues completed in 1959
Contemporary Chinese architecture
Football venues in Beijing
Athletics (track and field) venues in China
Sports venues in Beijing
Venues of the 2008 Summer Olympics
Olympic football venues
Stadiums of the Asian Games
Multi-purpose stadiums in China
Beijing Guoan F.C.
Buildings and structures in Chaoyang District, Beijing
Venues of the 1990 Asian Games
1959 establishments in China
2020 disestablishments in China